The 2018–19 Bahraini Premier League (also known as Nasser Bin Hamad Premier League for sponsorship reasons), is the 62nd top-level football season in Bahrain. The season started on 16 September 2018.

League table

Foreign players
The number of foreign players is limited to 6 per team, and should not be a goalkeeper.
Players name in bold indicates the player is registered during the mid-season transfer window.

Personnel

Relegation play-offs
First Leg [May 2]: Al-Hala 3–1 Sitra

Second Leg [May 7]: Sitra 1–1 Al-Hala

References

Bahraini Premier League seasons
1
Bahrain